Mantra is a composition by the German composer Karlheinz Stockhausen. It was composed in 1970 and premiered in autumn of the same year at the Donaueschingen Festival. The work is scored for two ring-modulated pianos; each player is also equipped with a chromatic set of crotales (antique cymbals) and a wood block, and one player is equipped with a short-wave radio producing morse code or a magnetic tape recording of morse code. In his catalogue of works, the composer designated it as work number 32.

History
Stockhausen had been interested for several years in writing something for the Kontarsky piano duo, and by early 1969 he had become determined to do so.) On a flight from the Northeastern United States to Los Angeles in September 1969 or shortly before, he had sketched "a kind of theater piece for two pianos" titled Vision, and in March 1970 began to work out a score, but broke off after just three pages. During an automobile trip from Madison, Connecticut to Boston, a melody came to Stockhausen, along with the idea of expanding such a musical figure over a very long period of time—fifty or sixty minutes. He jotted the melody down on an envelope at that time, but it only occurred to him after having abandoned Vision that this might become the basis for his new two-piano composition. Stockhausen later recalled that this was early in September 1969, but the sketch is in fact dated 26 February.

Later in the year, on 22 September 1969 at the Couvent d'Alziprato in southern France, he had composed an intuitive music text composition, Intervall, for two pianists playing "four-hands" (on one piano), but it did not appeal to the Kontarsky brothers—especially to Alfons, who lacked the experience his brother Aloys had gained from performing text-pieces from Aus den sieben Tagen, as a member of Stockhausen's ensemble. Intervall, eventually premiered by Roger Woodward and Jerzy Romaniuk, later became part of Stockhausen's second cycle of intuitive-music compositions, Für kommende Zeiten.

Stockhausen mentioned his wish to write something for the Kontarsky brothers to Heinrich Strobel, director of the Music Division of the SWF Baden-Baden and Artistic Director of the Donaueschinger Musiktage für Zeitgenossische Tonkunst and, toward the end of 1969, Strobel commissioned a work for two pianos for the 1970 Donaueschingen Festival. After abandoning Vision, Stockhausen took up the melody he had jotted down the previous September and on its basis made a form plan and laid out the new work's skeleton between 1 May and 20 June 1970 in Osaka, Japan. He then completed the score in an unbroken stretch of work at his home in Kürten from 10 July to 18 August 1970. Alfons and Aloys Kontarsky gave the premiere of Mantra in Donaueschingen on 18 October 1970, and made the first recording of the work from 10 to 13 June 1971 at the Tonstudio Kreillerstraße 22 in Munich, for Deutsche Grammophon. The score first appeared in print only in 1975, as one of the first publications of the composer's newly founded Stockhausen-Verlag.

Structure

The piece is the first determinate work (that is, the score is completely written down, though there are some passages involving a modest degree of improvisation) that Stockhausen composed after a long phase of indeterminate compositions.

This work involves the expansion and contraction of a counterpointed pair of melodies, which the composer calls a "formula". In this particular work (the first of a long succession of compositions to use formula technique), Stockhausen chose the term "mantra" in order "to avoid the words theme, row or subject, as in a fugue" (Stockhausen 2003, 2), and "Mantra" also became the title of the entire work. In Mantra, the two-strand formula is stated near the outset of the piece by piano I. According to the composer, the mantra "has thirteen notes, and each cymbal sound occurring once in the piece indicates the large sections—you hear the cymbal whenever a new central sound announces the next section of the work". Although "the cymbals have the same pitches as the mantra and can thus mark the 13 form cycles of the two pianists … they are not identical", and "there are also some sections in which a larger number of cymbal strokes occurs". Though this mantra recurs constantly, the structure of the composition is not a theme and variations as found in classical composers such as Beethoven and Bach, because the material is never varied, only expanded and contracted (both in duration and in pitch) to different degrees; not a single note is ever added, it is never "accompanied" or embellished. The comparatively strict predetermination of the form plan is occasionally broken and altered through the use of insertions, additions, and small deviations and exceptions. Near the end of the composition there is an extremely fast section that is a compression of the entire work into the smallest temporal space; in this section, all of the expansions and transpositions of the mantra formula are summarized as fast as possible and in four layers.

The "mantra" (melody formula) is made of an upper and lower voice; it is divided temporally into 4 segments with rests of 3, 2, 1, and 4 crotchets' duration following the segments. The 13 notes of the mantra's upper voice form a 12-tone row where the 13th note returns to the first note A. The lower voice consists of an intervallic inversion of the upper voice with transposed segments: the first segment of the lower voice corresponds to the inversion of second segment of the upper voice and vice versa; similarly, the third and fourth segments in the inverted voice are also exchanged.

Each of the 13 notes of the mantra has an attached characteristic, or "pitch form"; the 13 notes of the upper voice have in order the following characteristics:

 periodic repetition at the beginning (on A in the original transposition)
 accent at the end of a duration on B
 G without any characteristic
 a turn around the beginning of the note E
 slow tremolo between F and D
 an accented chord at the end of the F–D oscillation
 a sharp accent (with a single repetition) at the beginning of a duration on G
 a descending chromatic scale connecting the G to the following E
 staccato (very short duration) on D
 irregular repetition ("Morse code") of the note C
 an inverted (upper-note) mordent (trill nucleus) on the beginning of B
 sharp attack with an echo: sfz (fp), on G
 arpeggio connecting the previously articulated pitch (E-flat in the other voice, an augmented eleventh lower) upward to A

In addition to its articulative characteristic, each of the thirteen notes is assigned a particular dynamic, in approximate inverse proportion to its duration—that is, the softer a note's dynamic is, the longer is its duration. The very first note is the sole exception to this rule:
{| class="wikitable"
!colspan=3|a. with constant intensities
|-
|pp || 5.5 ×  || = character V
|-
|p  || 6 ×  || = character XIII
|-
|p || 4 ×  || = character IV
|-
|p || 1 ×  || = character I (exception)
|-
|mp || 4 ×  || = character XI
|-
|mp || 3 ×  || = character III
|-
|mf || 1 ×  || = character VI
|-
|f || 1 ×  || = character IX
|-
!colspan=3|b. with crescendo or decrescendo
|-
|(m)p > || 7 ×  || = character X
|-
|< mf || 2 ×  || = character VIII
|-
|sfz (fp) || 2 ×  || = character XII
|-
|(p)–f || 2 ×  || = character II, where f = 1 × 
|-
|ff >	|| 5 ×  || = character VII, where ff = 1 × 
|}

The thirteen cycles of the composition are based on the 13 notes of the mantra and the 13 characteristics detailed above. Each cycle is dominated by its corresponding note and characteristic. In this way, a single statement of the mantra is spread over the length of the entire composition, though the durations of the mantra notes are not incorporated into this overall plan.

The sounds of each piano are picked up by microphones and fed into an apparatus at the player's left side. This is called a Modul 69 B and was specially built for Mantra to the composer's specification by the Lawo company from Rastatt, near Baden-Baden. It consists of a microphone amplifier with three microphone inputs, a compressor, a filter, a ring modulator, a scaled sine-wave generator, and a volume control. By means of this device, each piano's sounds are ring modulated with a sine tone tuned to the central pitch corresponding to the note of the mantra formula governing each of the thirteen large segments of the composition, and the modulated sound is played over loudspeakers placed behind and above the performers. The first pianist presents the upper thirteen tones, the second pianist the lower thirteen tones. Because the starting/ending pitch of the mantra is successively transposed onto these central pitches, they sound completely "consonant", like ordinary piano tones. The other mantra pitches sound "dissonant" to varying degrees, and differ also from a normal piano to varying degrees in their timbre. "Hence one perceives a continual 'respiration' from consonant to dissonant to consonant modulator sounds, resulting from the precisely tuned relationships between the modulating sine tones and the modulated piano notes".

Recordings
 Rosalind Bevan, Yvar Mikashoff, Ole B. Ørsted (sound engineer: Mats Claessen; producer: Geir Johnson; executive producer: Foster Reed). CD recording. New Albion Records NAR 025. 1990.
 Andreas Grau, Götz Schumacher, Bryan Wolf (Tonmeister: Udo Wüstendörfer; sound engineer: Rüdiger Orth; producer: Ernstalbrecht Stiebler) – 1995, 
 Janka Wyttenbach, Jürg Wyttenbach, Thomas Kessler (enregistrement: Jürg Jecklin; montage: Malgorzata Albinska; producer: Samuel Muller; mastering: Tritonus Studio [Peter Länger]) – 1997, Karlheinz Stockhausen: Mantra. Accord 4642692 (202252)
 Pascal Meyer, Xenia Pestova, Jan Panis (engineer and editor: Jarek Frankowski; recording supervisor: Andrew Lewis; producer: Remy Franck) – 2010,  
 Mark Knoop, Roderick Chadwick, Newton Armstrong (producer and sound engineer: David Lefeber; executive producers: Berhard "Benne" Vischer and Werner X. Uehlinger). Recorded 5 and 6 January 2013, Hall Two, Kings Place, London. CD recording. Hat[now]Art 190. Basel: Hat Hut Records, Ltd., 2014.

Two recordings were supervised by the composer:
 Aloys and Alfons Kontarsky, Karlheinz Stockhausen (sound engineer: Klaus Hiemann; producer: Rudolf Werner) – 1971, Karlheinz Stockhausen: Mantra DG LP 2530 208. Reissued 1991, 
 Ellen Corver, Sepp Grotenhuis, Hans Tutschku (sound engineers: Bert Kraaijpoel, Jan Panis; producer: Maarten Hartveldt; digital editing: Chapel Studio Tilburg [Jan Panis, Hans Tutschku, Maarten Hartveldt]) – [1995], Stockhausen: Mantra, Supervised by Karlheinz Stockhausen TMD 950601. This recording received an Edison Classical Award in 1996.

References

Sources

Further reading

 Febel, Reinhard. 1998. Musik für zwei Klaviere seit 1950 als Spiegel der Kompositionstechnik, 2nd revised edition. Saarbrücken: Pfau-Verlag. .
 Frisius, Rudolf. 2008. Karlheinz Stockhausen II: Die Werke 1950–1977; Gespräch mit Karlheinz Stockhausen, "Es geht aufwärts". Mainz, London, Berlin, Madrid, New York, Paris, Prague, Tokyo, Toronto: Schott Musik International. .
 Kelsall, John. 1975. "Compositional Techniques in the Music of Stockhausen (1951–1970)". PhD diss. Glasgow: University of Glasgow.
 Toop, Richard. 2005. Six Lectures from the Stockhausen Courses Kürten 2002. Kürten: Stockhausen-Verlag. Lecture 3: "Mantra", pp. 75–98. .

External links
 Armstrong, Newton. n.d. "Stockhausen's Mantra (1970): A Technical Guide". City University, staff personal pages (accessed 25 July 2016).
 Lecture by Karlheinz Stockhausen on Mantra at the Imperial College, London, 1973. Part 1, Part 2, Part 3

20th-century classical music
Chamber music by Karlheinz Stockhausen
1970 compositions
Serial compositions
Compositions for two pianos